Below are the rosters of the teams that participated in the 2007 Copa América. Unlike the World Cup and European Championship, squads were 22-man, with many opting to take only two goalkeepers.

Group A

Bolivia
Head coach: Erwin Sánchez

Peru
Head coach: Julio César Uribe

Uruguay
Head coach: Óscar Tabárez

Venezuela
Head coach: Richard Páez

Group B

Brazil
Head coach: Dunga

Chile
Head coach:  Nelson Acosta

Ecuador
Head coach:  Luis Fernando Suárez

 * Replaced Luis Caicedo on 15 June 2007 due to injury.

Mexico
Head coach: Hugo Sánchez

 * Replaced Jared Borgetti on 26 June 2007 due to injury.

Group C

Argentina
Head coach: Alfio Basile

 Replaced Oscar Ustari on 18 June 2007 due to injury.

Colombia
Head coach: Jorge Luis Pinto

Paraguay
Head coach:  Gerardo Martino

United States
Head coach: Bob Bradley

Information and source gathered from ussoccer.com

Footnotes

2007 Copa América
2007